Skoryk is a surname. Notable people with the surname include:
 Mykola Skoryk (born 1972), Ukrainian politician
 Myroslav Skoryk (1938–2020), Ukrainian composer and teacher